Harpagophagus is an extinct genus of large, mostly carnivorous bone-crushing mammals known as bear dogs, of the family Amphicyonidae endemic to Europe during the Oligocene living from 33.9 to 23.03 Ma and existed for approximately .

Taxonomy
Harpagophagus was named by De Bonis (1971). It is not extant. Its type is Harpagophagus sanguinensis. It was assigned to Amphicyonidae by De Bonis (1971) and Carroll (1988).

References

Bear dogs
Oligocene caniforms
Prehistoric mammals of Europe
Prehistoric carnivoran genera